ABC Mid North Coast is an ABC Local Radio station based in Port Macquarie and broadcasting to the Mid North Coast region in New South Wales. This includes the towns and cities of Grafton, Coffs Harbour, Kempsey and Taree.

The station began as 2KP in 1954 originally as a relay of the national program. Studios were opened in Kempsey in 1956 but local news came from 2NR in Grafton until 1960 when the first locally produced bulletins began.  The station relocated to new studios in Port Macquarie in 2004.

ABC Mid North Coast is the originating station of Statewide Afternoons, heard on most of the other ABC Local Radio stations in New South Wales.

The station is heard on these main AM and FM frequencies:

2KP 684 AM
2TR 756 AM
2MRR 95.5 and 100.9 FM

See also
 List of radio stations in Australia

References

Mid North Coast
Radio stations in New South Wales
Radio stations established in 1954